Loch Con  is a small, remote, shallow, irregular shaped freshwater loch that is located in Glen Errochty in the Perth and Kinross council area, at the edge of the Scottish Highlands. It is directly north of Loch Errochty. Directly north of the loch at the east end is Loch Cruinn. It is the source of the Allt Con, which flows a short distance southwards past Sròn Choin to Loch Errochty. At the north-east end is Loch Cruinn, a very small dam, about 100 metres wide.

See also
 List of lochs in Scotland

References

Con
Con
Tay catchment
Birdwatching sites in Scotland